Metisse is a 2.5D windowing system, based on the X Window System.

Metisse or Métisse may also refer to:

 Métisse (band), an Irish/African Soul/Electronica band
 Métisse (film), a 1993 French film directed by Mathieu Kassovitz
 Métisse Motorcycles, a motorcycle manufacturer based in Carswell near Faringdon, Oxfordshire, England
 Citroën C-Métisse, a French concept car
 Métis, an Aboriginal people in Canada who trace their descent to mixed First Nations parentage

See also 
 Matisse (disambiguation)